Smithereens is the third studio album by Japanese singer-songwriter Joji, released on 4 November 2022 via 88rising and Warner Records. It was preceded by the singles "Glimpse of Us" and "Yukon (Interlude)". Joji is touring North America in promotion of the record from September 2022.

Background
The album is divided into two sides, with the first side containing "introspective ballads", while the second side, co-produced by Joji, contains "lo-fi, D.I.Y. sounds". Joji announced the Smithereens Tour over two months ahead of the album alongside the release of the lead single "Glimpse of Us", before officially announcing the album title and release date on 26 August 2022.

Singles
"Glimpse of Us" was released as the lead single from Smithereens on 10 June 2022. The song subsequently peaked atop the charts in Australia and New Zealand. "Yukon (Interlude)" was released as the second single alongside the official announcement of the album on 26 August 2022. "Die for You" was released as the third single on 4 November 2022, alongside the album's release.

Critical reception

Alex Nguyen of The Line of Best Fit complimented Joji's "vulnerability" and his "vocal performance" on "Glimpse of Us", but found the album overall to have "the same consistency problems as Nectar", "whether it's an underdeveloped track or one that meanders in a directionless fashion", along with being "less sonically adventurous than its predecessor, instead sticking to Miller's usual hazy synths and drum machines". Nguyen concluded that Smithereens has "the capacity to be great but stumbles due to run-of-the-mill production [and] impassive vocal delivery."

Neil Z. Yeung from AllMusic wrote, "Clocking in at under 30 minutes, Smithereens is the perfect length to wallow in sadness before wiping off the tears and carrying on. It's not the happiest of experiences, but it is his most mature and relatable statement to date."

Reviewing the album for Clash, James Mellen wrote that "Joji consistently reinvents himself and truly proves himself as one of the most interesting artists in the alternative, 'anti' pop sphere", calling the album a "concise, refined slice of that classic Joji sound, elevated by stronger songwriting and production choices".

Track listing
The album is divided into two parts, with five tracks on the first "part", and four on the second.

Notes

 All tracks on Part 2 are stylized in all caps.

Personnel
 Joji – vocals
 Dale Becker – mastering
 Jeff Ellis – mixing (1, 3, 4)
 Tristan Hoogland – mixing (2, 5–9)
 Trevor Taylor – mix engineering (1)
 Francisco "Frankie" Ramirez – recording (all tracks), vocal mixing (4–9)
 Noah McCorkle – mastering assistance (1, 3–9)
 Connor Hedge – mastering assistance (1, 2)
 Katie Harvey – mastering assistance (2–9)
 Ivan Handwerk – mixing assistance (1, 3, 4)
 Hamish Patrick – mixing assistance (2, 5–9)
 Joe Begalla – mixing assistance (2, 5–9)

Charts

References

2022 albums
88rising albums
Joji (musician) albums